This is a list of hip hop musicians from Canada.

Rappers

0-9

The 6th Letter
88Camino

A

Abdominal
Chuckie Akenz
Ale Dee
Anodajay
Arabesque
Aspektz
Langdon Auger

B

B-Kool
Backxwash
Bad News Brown
Baka Not Nice
Baracuda
Bbno$
Ishq Bector
Belly
Bender
Big Lean
Birdapres
Boogat
Cory Bowles
Wendy Motion Brathwaite
Baba Brinkman
Merlin Bronques
Buck 65

C

Cadence Weapon
Jazz Cartier
Don Cash
Checkmate
Choclair
Chokeules
Kwajo Cinqo
Clairmont the Second
Classified
Culture

D

D-Sisive
D.O.
Dan-e-o
Jesse Dangerously
Dax
Devon
DijahSB
DillanPonders
DL Incognito
Donnie
Drake
Drezus
DY

E

Eekwol
Emay
Jonathan Emile
JD Era
Eternia

F

Famous
Fateh
FouKi
Frankenstein
Fresh I.E.
Keysha Freshh
Friyie

G

Tommy Genesis
Ghettosocks
Goody Grace
Chilly Gonzales
Grandson
Tom Green

H

Honey Cocaine
Houdini
Nate Husser
Hyper-T

I

Imposs
Infinite

J

Jacky Jasper
Deep Jandu
JB
JB the First Lady
JDiggz
Jelleestone
Miles Jones
Junia-T

K

K-os
K.Maro
K'naan
Ian Kamau
Kardinal Offishall
Kay the Aquanaut
Daniel Kelly
Kid Twist
Rich Kidd
Killy
Wab Kinew
Allan Kingdom
Kish
Cody Ko
Koriass
Yvon Krevé
Pierre Kwenders
Kyprios
Kytami

L

Jon Lajoie
Mark Lee
Sean Leon
Crystle Lightning
Lil Pappie
Lil Windex
Livestock
Rich London
Lord Kemy
Loud

M

Tom MacDonald
Madchild
Maestro Fresh Wes
Reema Major
Manafest
Josh Martinez
Masia One
Massari
mcenroe
Michie Mee
Haviah Mighty
Manu Militari
MLMA
Modulok
More or Les
Moka Only
Roger Mooking
Mr. Q
Mr. Roam
Muneshine

N

Narcy
Nav
Naya Ali
Troy Neilson
Night Lovell
Noah23
Graph Nobel
NorthSideBenji

O

Organik

P

AR Paisley
PartyNextDoor
Gregory Pepper
Lou Phelps
Pip Skid
Powfu
Preme
Pressa
Prevail
Jimmy Prime
Professor D
Promise
Puffy L'z
Pvrx

R

RationaL
Eric Reprid
Sébastien Ricard
Ricky J
John River
Nova Rockafeller
Roi Heenok
Rumble

S

Safe
Samian
Cale Sampson
Sarahmée
Saukrates
Shad
Wali Shah
Sir Pathétik
Sixtoo
Smoke Dawg
Snak the Ripper
Socalled
Solitair
SonReal
Spek
Spek Won
Split Personality
Kinnie Starr
Stuart Stone
Joey Stylez
Sydanie

T

Yas Taalat
Tablo
Tasha the Amazon
Thrust
Timbuktu
Tizzo
Tobi
Tory Lanez
Transit
Tre Mission

V

Vaï

W

Webster
The Weeknd
Jay Whiss
Freddy Will
Odario Williams
Derek Wise
Roy Woods
Wordburglar
Kris Wu

Y

Chris Yonge
Young Kidd
Yung Tory

Bands

0–9

The 20/20 Project
88Glam

A

A-Game
Alaclair Ensemble
Aquakultre
Atach Tatuq

B

Baby Blue Soundcrew
Backburner
BadBadNotGood
Big Black Lincoln
Birth Through Knowledge
Boombox Saints
Buck N' Nice
Burd & Keyz
Busty and the Bass

C

Cartel Madras
The Celestics
Citizen Kane
Criollo

D

Da Grassroots
Dance Appeal
Dead Celebrity Status
Dead Obies
Dirty Circus
The Dope Poet Society
Down with Webster
Dragon Fli Empire
Dream Warriors
Dubmatique

F

Farm Fresh
First Words
Flight Distance
Freaks of Reality

G

Gatineau
Gazeebow Unit
Ghetto Concept
Grand Analog
Da Gryptions

H

Halal Gang
The Halluci Nation
Hip Club Groove

I

IRS

J

Just John x Dom Dias

L

LMDS
Loco Locass
Lyrical Assault

M

Main Source
The Maximum Definitive
MCJ and Cool G
Mood Ruff
Muzion

N

Naturally Born Strangers
Nomadic Massive

O

The Oddities
OK Cobra
Omnikrom
Organized Rhyme

P

Pigeon Hole
Pocket Dwellers
Point Blank
Prime Boys
Project Wyze

R

Radio Radio
Raggadeath
Rascalz
Rime Organisé
Rumble & Strong

S

Sans Pression
Scales Empire
Self Taught
Shades of Culture
Simply Majestic
Singing Fools
Snotty Nose Rez Kids
So Loki
Social Deviantz
The Sorority
Super Duty Tough Work
Sweatshop Union
Swollen Members

T

TBTBT
Team Rezofficial
Thunderheist
Tone Mason
Touch and Nato
Tru-Paz

V

Vice Verset
Villain Accelerate

W

War Party
Winnipeg's Most
Women Ah Run Tings

Beatboxers

KRNFX
Poizunus
Corey Vidal

DJs

4th Pyramid
A-Trak
Agile
Frank Dukes
DJ G-Starr
Jam on Strong
K-Cut
Kaytranada
Kid Koala
Ron Nelson
Ghislain Poirier
Shawn Singleton
Sixtoo
Skratch Bastid

Singers

The 6th Letter
Addictiv
Justin Bieber
Big Lean
Black Atlass
Shawn Desman
Drake
Dru
Empire I
Melanie Fiona
Raz Fresco
Friyie
Nelly Furtado
Honey Cocaine
Houdini
Jememi
Miles Jones
JRDN
Yvon Krevé
Margeaux
Massari
Andreena Mill
Ishan Morris
Jahkoy Palmer
Alyssa Reid
Tamia
The Weeknd
Jay Whiss
Kris Wu
XSDTRK

Instrumentalists

Rob Johnson

Producers

 40
 Boi-1da
 Murda Beatz
 T-Minus
 WondaGurl

See also 

 Canadian hip hop
 Music of Canada

References

Canadian

Hip hop